Karina Gould  (born June 28, 1987) is a Canadian politician who has been the minister of families, children and social development since October 26, 2021. A member of the Liberal Party, she serves as a member of Parliament (MP) and has represented the riding of Burlington in the House of Commons since October 19, 2015. Gould was first appointed to Cabinet on February 1, 2017 as the minister of democratic institutions, serving in the role until she was appointed as the minister of international development on November 20, 2019, before assuming her current portfolio. Gould is the youngest woman to serve as a Cabinet minister in Canadian history.

Early life and career 
Gould was born on June 28, 1987, growing up in Burlington, Ontario in a family with three brothers. Her paternal grandparents were Czech Jews who survived the Holocaust. Her mother is German and met her father while on a kibbutz in Israel. At sixteen, she participated in the Forum for Young Canadians, spending a week in Ottawa learning about the federal government, which she credits as the impetus for her goal of a career in Parliament. After she graduated from M.M. Robinson High School in 2005, she spent the next year volunteering at an orphanage in Mexico, where she met her husband, Alberto Gerones.

Upon her return to Canada in 2006, Gould attended McGill University, earning a joint honours degree in political science as well as Latin American and Caribbean studies. Writing her honours thesis on the Canadian electoral system, she graduated first class honours with distinction in 2010. During her time as an undergraduate student she served as the president of the Arts Undergraduate Society (AUS) and helped organize fundraising for humanitarian aid for Haiti in the aftermath of the 2010 earthquake.

In 2010, Gould took a job with the Organization of American States in Washington, D.C., working as a consultant in the Migration and Development Program. She is cited as contributing to the 2011 report, International Migration in the Americas: First Report of the Continuous Reporting System on International Migration in the Americas (SICREMI).

Gould subsequently completed a master's degree in international relations at Oxford University. Upon completion of her graduate studies at Oxford, Gould decided to move back to her hometown of Burlington, Ontario. She took a job working as a Trade and Investment Specialist for the Mexican Trade Commission "ProMexico" in Toronto. Gould held this position for less than a year before announcing her candidacy in the 2015 election at the age of twenty-eight.

Political career

2015 Canadian federal election 
During the election campaign, she attracted minor attention for deleting a three-year-old tweet expressing opposition to the Enbridge Northern Gateway Pipelines – eventually not approved by the Trudeau government – and to the development of the Alberta tar sands in general. She defeated Conservative incumbent Mike Wallace, who had represented the riding since the 2006 federal election, by winning 46% of the vote to his 42.5%.

Reflecting upon her first campaign in 2019 interview, Gould said: "In 2015, I'd say the No. 1 thing people asked me at the door was how old I was and why I thought I could jump into politics at such a young age... And I know, for a fact, that they wouldn't ask a man of the same age those questions."

Parliamentary Secretary 
Gould was named the parliamentary secretary to the minister of international development and La Francophonie on December 2, 2015. During her time in this role she chaired a foreign-aid strategy session at the Health Systems Research Conference in Vancouver (2016) where stated that it was important to empower women and girls within a feminist approach to foreign-aid. During United States President Barack Obama's July 2016 state visit to Ottawa, he gave a shout out to Burlington during his address to Parliament (where his brother-in-law Konrad Ng lives) prompting Gould to wave for the cameras, in what Maclean's called her most high-profile moment.

Minister of Democratic Institutions 
On January 10, 2017, she was named Minister of Democratic Institutions, succeeding Maryam Monsef. She also became the President of the Queen's Privy Council for Canada. These appointments made her the youngest female Cabinet minister in Canadian history, taking office at the age of twenty-nine.

Despite electoral reforms being a pledged mandate of Prime Minister Justin Trudeau's 2015 campaign, with this appointment such electoral reforms were no longer part of the Minister of Democratic Institutions mandate. Instead, Gould's mandate included commitments to strengthen Canada's democratic institutions and improve Canada's democratic process by addressing and cyber threats like online meddling and the spread of disinformation from social media giants and combating foreign interference. Gould has been credited as being instrumental in not both passing and defending Bill C-76 or Elections Modernization Act, which made significant amendments to the Canadian Elections Act, including numerous accommodations for voter accessibility, restrictions on third-party interference on election campaigns, and a prohibition on spending by foreign entities during elections.

2019 Canadian federal election 
Running as the incumbent in the 2019 Canadian federal election, Gould was re-elected to her seat. Gould's hometown support proved to only be growing as her 2019 results surpassed that of  2015, winning 48.6% of the vote to Conservative Jane Michael's 33.2% Winning just 157 seats as opposed to the 177 held prior, Gould's growing support in this key Southern Ontario riding enabled her party to obtain a minority government in the 2019 Canadian federal election.

Minister for International Development
Gould became the minister for international development, a key position in Trudeau's foreign policy. It came to light on May 18, 2020 that Gould was formally in charge of the Canadian government's sponsorship of the World Health Organization (WHO). As minister she is entrusted the discussions with Dr. Tedros Adhanom, WHO's director-general. She had a "good and frank conversation" with him via electronic means the week before the 73rd World Health Assembly.

Minister of Families, Children and Social Development 
Gould was shuffled to the families, children and social development portfolio on October 26, 2021. In May 2022, followings leaks of the American Supreme Court's draft opinion of Dobbs v. Jackson, Gould said American women could access abortions in Canada before Roe v. Wade was overturned. She also expressed concern for Canadian women who accessed abortion in the United States because of lack of access in Canada.

During the spring and summer of 2022, the government received criticism regarding long passport processing times, which fell under her ministerial responsibilities. The federal government had shut down Services Canada Centres and Passport Offices in March 2020 because of the COVID-19 pandemic and limited applications to "valid urgent travel reasons". Service Canada had warned of high demand for passport applications to come following the loosening of pandemic restrictions, which the government had underestimated. Slow processing times led to lengthy delays, forcing many Canadians to cancel travel plans.

Personal life 
Gould married her husband, Alberto Gerones, in 2011. She gave birth to her first child Oliver on March 8, 2018, making her the first sitting federal Cabinet minister to give birth while in office. Her breastfeeding her then three-month-old son during question period in the House of Commons attracted media attention during June 2018.

Electoral record

References

External links
 Official Website
 Bio & mandate from the Prime Minister
 

Liberal Party of Canada MPs
Living people
Members of the House of Commons of Canada from Ontario
Members of the King's Privy Council for Canada
Members of the 29th Canadian Ministry
People from Burlington, Ontario
Women government ministers of Canada
Women members of the House of Commons of Canada
Jewish Canadian politicians
Alumni of St Hilda's College, Oxford
McGill University alumni
Women in Ontario politics
1987 births
21st-century Canadian women politicians
Canadian people of Czech-Jewish descent
Canadian people of German descent